Åshild Hauan (20 April 1941–1 December 2017) was a Norwegian politician for the Labour Party.  She served as the County Governor of Nordland county from 1991 until 2007.

Personal life
She was born on 20 April 1941 in Velfjord in southern Nordland county in Norway. Her parents were sawmill owner Paul Drevland (1914-1978) and homemaker Gunnvor Wester (1919-1979).  She married Åsbjørn Hauan and had two children, and later three grandchildren.  She died of cancer on 1 December 2017 in the town of Bodø in Nordland county, Norway.

Education and career
She held various positions on the Rana Municipality council between 1975 and 1983. Hauan was a member of Nordland county council between 1979 and 1983.

She served in the position of deputy representative in the Parliament of Norway during the term from 1977–1981. She was then elected as a full representative from Nordland county in 1981, and she was re-elected in 1985 and again in 1989, serving until 1993. Hauan was President of the Odelsting from 1985–1989.

During her third term in Parliament, she was named County Governor in 1991.  Since she was still serving in the Parliament of Norway at that time, Davis Idin Pareli Johansen was named the acting governor.  He served for her from 1991 until 1993 when she completed her term in Parliament and moved to Bodø to begin working as governor.

References

1941 births
2017 deaths
County governors of Nordland
Labour Party (Norway) politicians
Women members of the Storting
Members of the Storting
20th-century Norwegian politicians
20th-century Norwegian women politicians